Delhi Public School, Warangal (commonly known as DPS Warangal) is a day and residential CBSE school with more than 1200 students. The school started functioning on 19 June 2014. It is operated under the aegis of Delhi Public School Society, New Delhi.

Awards and recognition 
The school was recognised as the best school in Warangal, Telangana by Education World 2022-23 ranking.  The school has also been recognised as among the top 10 residential schools in the country by Silicon India's Education magazine

References

External links
School Website

Delhi Public School Society
Schools in Telangana
Education in Warangal
Educational institutions established in 2014
2014 establishments in Telangana